Bolohan is a village in Orhei District, Moldova.

Notable people
 Igor Moroz, a protester in the post-election riots in Chișinău who died while in police custody

References

Villages of Orhei District